Jacqueline Brennan is an Australian stage, television and film actress with a career that has spanned over 30 years appearing in film, theatre and voice-over roles. Jacquie Brennan is known for her roles on Bullpitt!, The Hollowmen,and her most known role in Australian award-winning TV Drama Wentworth as Officer Linda 'Smiles' Miles.

Education 
Jacquie Brennan graduated from the University of Southern Queensland with a Diploma of Performing Arts.

Career 
Jacquie Brennan's career began in 1986 appearing in theatre in both the Queensland Theatre Company and later the Sydney Theatre company.

With steady TV work mostly in comedies or dramatic roles including Stingers, Kingswood Country spin-off Bullpitt!  City Homicide and many more.

Brennan has also worked extensively in the Australian Theatre Company working in both the Queensland and Sydney theatre companies respectively, these also included a self-written one woman show called 'Dangerous When Wet' as well and in the 60s spoof group The Harlettes during their Australian Tour. Jacquie's other theatre works include Are You Being Served? on the Australian Tour during its run in 2001, Room To Move, Camille, Rosy Apples  Too Darn Hot, Macquarie, Beach Blanket Tempest, Silhouette and many more.

Brennan is a well-known and sought after voice over artist she has lent her voice to multiple voice over productions including SheZow, Kuu Kuu Harajuku, Get Ace, Monster Beach, Australian-Canadian co-production Big Words, Small Stories, and many more. Brennan also provided her voice overs for many companies ads and In 2018 Jacquie was rewarded for her efforts with a Voice Over Award or 'VoVo' for 'Most Emotionally Powerful Delivery' for the Peter MacCullum Cancer Centre ad 'Prevent, Detect, Act'.

Brennan later provided the audio narration for the book 'Blood River' in 2019 and in 2022 Brennan provided the narration for the audiobook 'Wake'.

In 2020, Brennan appeared in the Underbelly adaptation Informer 3838 where she played real life Christine Hodson a victim of the Melbourne gangland killings, Christine's death during the height of the gangland war 'broke the code' as a gang war was to always exclude the partners as you never went for them. filming for one scene (the Hodson death scene) was so intense Brennan's body 'went into shock' after the take was completed.

Brennan joined the cast of Wentworth in 2012 when the series first went into production and was originally only contracted to the show for 8 days, she came into set reading alongside other cast for roles but was told to read for a 'small role' by the series set up director Kevin Carlin who explained it was only set to be a small role but he knew that Jacquie wanted to be involved in the series, that 'small role' ended up being the role of Officer Linda Miles. Brennan has since then revealed she originally auditioned for Liz Birdsworth.

Brennan has since revealed that following season one of Wentworth a running-gag developed as Linda was given so little to do in the first season Linda just mostly 'opened doors' and gave 'excellent reactions' during certain scenes as the head writer Timothy Hobart took notice and "kept writing" for Linda, developing her character along the way. Brennan had said she came up with Linda's backstory and how the character of Linda became an officer. Linda's backstory was that she had lost everything gambling including her house, her job and her marriage, Linda became an officer to be 'well paid'.

Brennan played prison officer Linda 'Smiles' Miles, her first appearance was in season 1 episode 2 and had been part of the supporting cast for the shows entire run. In season 7 Linda was promoted to acting deputy governor and Jacquie would reprise the role of Linda Miles during the filming for the final 20 episodes of the series, where Linda would be riddled with PTSD after the events of the siege. Brennan was in every season of Wentworth appearing in 99 episodes of the series.

Brennan in 2022 would join the filming for SBS crime legal drama Safe Home, the fourth season of popular local drama Five Bedrooms and Jacquie would also join the cast for the controversial Shane Warne two part tele-movie titled Warnie where she would play Shane's mother Brigitte Warne.

Brennan would appear alongside several Wentworth cast members at Wentworth Con Melbourne in 2022.

Personal life 
Jacquie Brennan is married to fellow actor Ian Bliss the two met in 1999 on the set of theatre play Silhouette at an after party at a Barbeque where Ian and Jacquie met, Ian would drive Jacquie to rehearsal and the two begun a close bond. Jacquie and Ian married in 2001, they have two children together.

Filmography

References

External links 
 
 
 Jacquie Brennan on LMCM 

Living people
Year of birth missing (living people)
Australian film actresses
Australian soap opera actresses
Australian stage actresses
Australian television actresses
Australian voice actresses
20th-century Australian actresses
21st-century Australian actresses